A salut d'amor ("love letter", lit. "greeting of love") or (e)pistola ("epistle") was an Occitan lyric poem of the troubadours, written as a letter from one lover to another in the tradition of courtly love. Some songs preserved in the Italian Quattrocento and Cinquecento chansonniers are labelled in the rubrics as saluts (or some equivalent), but the salut is not treated as a genre by medieval Occitan grammarians. The trouvères copied the Occitan song style into Old French as the salut d'amour. There are a total of nineteen surviving Occitan saluts and twelve French ones, with a Catalan examples (of the salutació amorosa) also.

The poetic form probably derives from the classical Latin love letter and through a blending of the ars dictaminis and the early Occitan canso. Occitan scholar Pierre Bec argued that the salut was tripartite, possessing an introduction, body, and conclusion. Christiane Leube believes that the Latin five-part division of salutatio, captatio benevolentiae, narratio, petitio, and conclusio formed the basis for the salut, but that the salutatio and captatio blended into one segment and all but the conclusio being less rigidly delineated. Dietmar Rieger regards the salut less as a letter than as a variant of the canso intended not to be sung in performance but to be read. The Occitan saluts do not have stanzas or refrains, but several French ones do (salut à refrains). Structurally they are usually octosyllabic rhyming couplets, but a few are hexasyllabic and Raimon de Miraval wrote a heterometric salut. They often end with a one-word verse, unrhymed with anything previous, that gives the addressee: Domna or Dompna.

The first salut d'amor was probably Domna, cel qe'us es bos amics, written by Raimbaut d'Aurenga and he served as a model for many later troubadours. Arnaut de Mareuil wrote five saluts, the most of any individual, and Don Alfred Monson has crowned him the maître incontesté du salut ("the uncontested master of the salut"). They served as a model for Amanieu de Sescars, who wrote two precisely datable saluts in 1278 and 1291. Falquet de Romans wrote a salut d'amor (epistola in the rubric) of 254 lines. The only female author of a salut was Azalais d'Altier. Her 101 verses of rhyming couplets were designed to reconcile two lovers and were addressed to a woman, possibly Clara d'Anduza. In French the only named author of a salut with refrains is Philippe de Rémi.

Destret d'emors mi clam a vos is a 708-line long anonymous Catalan salut.

Notes

References

Sources

External links
Folio 8r from the Cançoner Gil, showing Cerverí de Girona's Apres lo vers comença del comte la lissos, a pistola according to the rubric

Western medieval lyric forms
Occitan literary genres
Medieval poetry